The 2016 Global Touring Car Championship (commercially known as the 2016 Sasol GTC Championship) was the inaugural season of the Global Touring Car Championship, a South African touring car racing series. The series was scheduled for six rounds, consisting of a total of fourteen races from 9 August until 3 December.

Michael Stephen became the series's first champion, taking seven race wins from the first eight races behind the wheel of an Audi A3 GTC. Daniel Rowe took the title in GTC Production, the second class of the series consisting of production racing cars, driving a Volkswagen Golf GTi. BMW took the manufacturer's title in the GTC Class, while Volkswagen secured the GTC Production title.

Teams and drivers

GTC

GTC Production

Calendar

Championship standings
Points were awarded to the top ten classified finishers as follows:

Additionally, the top three placed drivers in qualifying will also receive points.

Drivers' Standings

References

Touring car racing